Paul Bley with Gary Peacock is an album by Canadian jazz pianist Paul Bley with American bassist Gary Peacock recorded in 1963 and 1968 and released on the ECM label in 1970.

Reception
The Allmusic review by David R. Adler awarded the album 3 stars stating "There's a curiously straight-ahead, tempo-driven feel to this short and sweet disc... The brittle, lo-fi sound doesn't detract from the album's historical value".  The Penguin Guide to Jazz said "There are good things, too, from what was to be Bley's established trio. Up until that point most of the trio's best work seems to have gone unrecorded".

Track listing
All compositions by Paul Bley except as indicated
 "Blues" (Ornette Coleman) - 4:25 
 "Getting Started" - 4:26 
 "When Will the Blues Leave?" (Coleman) - 3:54 
 "Long Ago (and Far Away)" (Ira Gershwin, Jerome Kern) - 4:18 
 "Moor" (Gary Peacock) - 3:29 
 "Gary" (Annette Peacock) - 4:42 
 "Big Foot" - 3:27 
 "Albert's Love Theme" (Annette Peacock) - 4:53   
Recorded in New York City on April 13, 1963 (tracks 1-5) and  May 11, 1968 (tracks 6-8).

Personnel
 Paul Bley - Piano 
 Gary Peacock - Bass
 Paul Motian (tracks 1-5), Billy Elgart (tracks 6-8) - Drums

References

ECM Records albums
Paul Bley albums
Gary Peacock albums
1970 albums
Albums produced by Manfred Eicher